The Asus Vivo lineup consists of laptops (VivoBooks), All-in-Ones (Vivo AiO), desktops (VivoPC), Stick PCs (VivoStick), Mini PCs (VivoMini), smartwatches (VivoWatch), computer mouse (VivoMouse) and tablets (VivoTab). Like with many other Windows computers, various different configurations of specification exist of each models.

VivoBook 
Some Asus VivoBook models are branded under different series depending on regions and/or time. For example, the VivoBook E12 E203 used to be marketed under the VivoBook E Series but has since been marketed without 'E12' and under the Asus Laptop series.

VivoBook 4K 
The Asus VivoBook 4K uses a 15.6" 16:9 IPS 4K (3840 x 2160) display with a color gamut of 72% NTSC, 100% sRGB, and 74% Adobe RGB. The laptop supports up to Intel Core i7 processor, up to 12GB of RAM, up to a 2TB HDD and up to a Nvidia 940M video card. The I/O consists of a combo audio jack, a VGA port, 2x USB 3.0 port(s), 1x USB 2.0 port(s), a RJ45 LAN Jack and a HDMI.

VivoBook E Series 
The Asus VivoBook E Series is the successor to the EeeBook and Eee PC lineup of computers. Some of the VivoBook E Series laptops are simply rebadged EeeBook laptops such as the E402 and E202. The VivoBook E Series consists of the E200 (E200HA), E201 (E201NA), E202 (E202SA), E12 E203 (E203NAH and E203NA), E402 (E402SA, E402NA, E402BA and E402BP), E403 (E403SA and E403NA) and E502 (E502NA).

E200 Reception 
Windows Central rated the E200HA 4 out of 5 concluded by stating that the E200H has a great design, good touchpad, runs quiet and cool and has good speakers but also commented that it has a bad display and oddly sized keyboard. pcverge gave the E200HA a rating of 74% commenting that it is very inexpensive, light and well-made build with excellent battery life but could be improved with better viewing angles, a better Keyboard and a larger touchpad.

VivoBook F Series 
The VivoBook F Series consists of the F200 (F200MA, F200CA and F200LA), F450 ( F450CA and F450CC) and F550 (F550LD).

VivoBook Max 
The VivoBook Max Series consists of the X441 (X441SA, X441UV, X441SC, X441NC, X441UA, X441NA and X441UR) and X541 (X541UX, X541UA, X541SA and X541SCM)

VivoBook Pro
The VivoBook Pro is available in twenty two variants: 

 N550JX
 N550JV
 N550JK
 N551VW
 N551JM
 N551JB
 N551JQ
 N551JK
 N551JX
 N551JW
 N551ZU
 N552VW 
 N552VX 
 N56JK
 N56JN
 N56JR
 N580VD
 N750JK 
 N750JV
 N751JZ
 N751JK
 N752VX

VivoBook S Series (1) 
The VivoBook S Series consists S200E, S300 (S300CA), S301 (S301LP and S301LA). S400 (S400CA), S451 (S451LN, S451LB and S451LA), S500 (S500CA), S550 (S550CA, S550CB and S550CM) and S551 (S551LA, S551LB and S551LN)

VivoBook S Series (2) 
The VivoBook S Series was revived in 2017 with the VivoBook S15 (S510) at Computex 2017 in May, 2017. At Computer 2018 in June 2018, the VivoBook S Series was updated which included the S15 (S530), S14 (S430) and S13 (S330). In almost all regions, the 2018 models were sold alongside updated 2017 models.

The VivoBook S Series consists of:

 S13 (S330UA) - 8th generation Intel Core i processors, Intel UHD Graphics 620, 13.3” Full HD (1920 x 1080) 16:9 matte display, LPDDR3 RAM and SATA SSD
 S13 (S30UN)
 S14 (S406UA)
 S14 (S410UA)
 S14 (S410UF)
 S14 (S410UN)
 S14 (S410UQ)
 S14 (S430UA)
 S14 (S430UF)
 S14 (S430UN)
 S15 (S510UA)
 S15 (S510UF)
 S15 (S510UN)
 S15 (S510UQ)
 S15 (S510UR)
 S15 (S531/32FL/S531/32EA)
 S15 (S530UA)
 S15 (S530UF)
 S15 (S530UN)

VivoBook W Series

VivoBook X Series 
The VivoBook X Series consists of 
 X202 (X202E)
 x403, X405 (X405UQ)
 x409
 X410
 X4442 (X442UQ)
 X455 (X455LA)
 X456 (X456UR)
 X456UA
 X4506UQ and X456UV)
 x509
 X540 (X540YA, X540SA, X540LA, X540UP, X540LJ and X540SC)
 X542 (X542UN, X542UQ, X542UR and X542UA)
X543 (X543MA, X543ME)
 X5501
 X555 (X555DG, X555QG)
 X556 (X556UQ, X556UR, X556UA, X556UV, X556UJ, X556UF)
 X705 (X705UV)
 and X751 (X751NV, X751BP and X751NA).

Vivo AiO 
The Vivo AiO is a lineup of all-in-one desktop computers.

List of Vivo Aio products

 Vivo AiO V200 (V200IB)
 Vivo AiO V220 (V220IC, V220IB, V220IA)
 Vivo AiO V221 (V221ID, V221IC)
 Vivo AiO V222 (V222GB, V222UA, V222GA, V222UB)
 Vivo Ai0 V230 (V230IC)
 Vivo Ai0 V241 (V241IC)
 Vivo AiO V272 (V272UN, V272UA)

VivoPC 

Some of Asus' desktop products have been rebadged and marketed as VivoPC's

VivoStick 
The VivoStick is a single-board computer. Its model number is: TS10.

VivoMini 
The VivoMini is a lineup of small form factor computer

List of VivoMini products

 VivoMini UN45
 VivoMini UN62
 VivoMini UN65 (UN65H, UN65U)
 VivoMini UN68U
 VivoMini VC65
 VivoMini VC65R
 VivoMini VC66
 VivoMini VC66R
 VivoMini VC68V
 VivoMini VM45
 VivoMini VM65

VivoWatch 
The Asus VivoWatch has a built in heart rate sensor and IP67 water resistance rating. There is also the VivoWatch BP which has built-in blood pressure measurement.

Reception 
Engadget gave a rating of 79% in their review of the VivoWatch which mentioned the positives being "Elegant design, Highly visible heart rate zone LED, Automatic sleep tracking, Great battery life and Continuous heart rate monitoring" while the cons being "Doesn't track distance, No app notifications, App still needs some polish and Can't export data to third-party apps".

TechRadar gave the VivoWatch a three star rating in their review which mentioned the positives being "Easy to read, always on screen, 10 days of battery life and Reasonably priced" while the cons being "Basic companion app, Unnecessary happiness monitor and Doesn't stand out from the crowd".

Wareable gave a three star rating for the VivoWatch in their review stating which mentioned the positives being "Good price, Excellent battery life and Useful heart rate LED" while the cons being "No notifications, No distance/GPS/sports and App needs work".

VivoTab 
Further Information: Asus VivoTab

VivoTab is a series of Microsoft Windows hybrid tablet computers designed by Asus. The name is derived from the Latin word "to live" and, along with Asus's Transformer series of convertible devices running Windows, is a primary competitor to the Microsoft Surface.

The family is made up of the VivoTab, VivoTab RT, VivoTab RT 3G, VivoTab RT LTE, VivoTab Smart, and later on the VivoTab Note 8. All of the tablets come with Windows 8 (or Windows 8.1 on the Note 8), a 3-year subscription to Asus WebStorage. They have high definition screens advertise ultra-portability and extended battery life, and the ability detachable tablets. VivoTab RT has an MSRP of US$599 (32GB) and $699 (64GB)

VivoMouse 
There are two Asus VivoMouse, the VivoMouse WT710 and VivoMouse Metallic Edition WT720. The VivoMouse can be used as a standard desktop mouse, touchpad which supports gestures in Windows or wireless remote.

Specifications

References

Asus products
Consumer electronics brands
All-in-one desktop computers